Qingshuping Town is an urban town in Shuangfeng County, Hunan Province, People's Republic of China.

Administrative division
The town is divided into 64 villages and 2 communities, the following areas: 

  Qingshu Community
  Laitoushan Village
  Qingshuping Village
  Qinglong Village
  Hongxing Village
  Congfeng Village
  Jincheng Village
  Congyi Village
  Quanjie Village
  Congde Village
  Jiansheng Village
  Xunmin Village
  Ceshi Village
  Dalian Village
  Shuangtian Village
  Renhe Village
  Hexin Village
  Lishan Village
  Shanjiajing Village
  Shuitian Village
  Xingwang Village
  Tiandang Village
  Weixin Village
  Weixing Village
  Wangri Village
  Huangtian Village
  Wuxing Village
  Jietang Village
  Daxin Village
  Jiefeng Village
  Jiepai Village
  Sanlian Village
  Yumin Village
  Zhuhua Village
  Huaguo Village
  Shuanghua Village
  Jingchu Village
  Yejia Village
  Nongjia Village
  Gaoxing Village
  Shizijiang Village
  Hongquan Village
  Jianquan Village
  Jianlou Village
  Dapingli Village
  Fanxin Village
  Xinshi Village
  Gongtong Village
  Yangtang Village
  Shili Village
  Xianghua Village
  Zhongwang Village
  Zhongxin Village
  Chayuan'ao Village
  Renxing Village
  Laotian Village
  Minxing Village
  Yinshen Village
  Liangyi Village
  Guangyi Village
  Guangyi Village
  Changle Village
  Daquan Village
  Jinsha Village
  Jinling Village
  Fanping Village

External links

Divisions of Shuangfeng County